Saint Anne's School may refer to:

India
 St. Anne's High School, Bandra, Mumbai, India
 St. Anne's High School, Orlem, Mumbai, India
 St. Anne's Convent High School, Pune, India
 St. Anne's School, Jodhpur, India
 Saint Ann's High School, Secunderabad, India

Malaysia
 St. Anne's Primary School, Sarikei, Sarawak
 St. Anne's Secondary School, Victoria, Labuan 
 St. Anne's Convent Secondary School, Kulim, Kedah

Republic of Ireland
 St. Anne's Primary School, Fettercairn, Tallaght, Dublin 24
 St. Anne's Secondary School, Milltown, Dublin 6
 St. Anne's Community College, Killaloe
 Industrial Schools in Ireland
St. Ann’s Industrial School for Girls and Junior Boys, Renmore, Lenaboy, Co. Galway
St. Ann's Industrial School for Girls, Killarney, Co. Kerry
St. Anne’s Industrial School for Girls, Booterstown, Co. Dublin
St. Anne’s Reformatory School for Girls, Kilmacud, Co. Dublin

United Kingdom
 St. Anne's Catholic School (Southampton), England
 St Anne's Catholic High School, London, England
 St Anne's RC Voluntary Academy, Stockport, England
 St Anne's Primary School, Belfast, Northern Ireland
 St Anne's Roman Catholic Primary School, Caversham, Reading, Berkshire, United Kingdom

United States
 St. Anne's School, (Barrington, Illinois)
 Saint Ann's School (Brooklyn)
 St. Anne School (Fair Lawn, New Jersey)
 St. Anne School (Laguna Niguel, California)
 St. Anne School (Seattle, Washington)
 St. Anne‒Pacelli Catholic School, Columbus, Georgia
 St. Anne's School of Annapolis, Annapolis, Maryland
 St. Anne Catholic School (Houston, Texas), Houston, USA

Elsewhere
 St Anne's Catholic School (Manurewa), Auckland, New Zealand
 St Anne's School (Woolston), Christchurch, New Zealand
 St. Anne School (Saskatoon), Saskatchewan, Canada
 The Cathedral School, Townsville (The Cathedral School of St Anne and St James), Townsville, Queensland, Australia, formerly known as St. Anne's School
 St. Anne's Catholic Secondary School, Clinton, Ontario, Canada
 St. Anne's School, Nassau, Bahamas